Nigel Wright (8 November 1973) is an English former professional rugby league footballer who played in the 1990s and 2000s, and has coached in the 2010s.

Playing career

Club career
Wright is the joint-fifth youngest player (along with Neil Fox) to make his début for Wakefield Trinity aged 16-years and 3-months in 1990.

Wright played  and scored a goal, and a drop goal in Trinity's 29–16 victory over Sheffield Eagles in the 1992–93 Yorkshire Cup Final at Elland Road, Leeds on 18 October 1992.

In 1993, Wigan paid Wakefield a fee of £140,000 for Wright, which was a record transfer fee for a teenager. A series of ankle injuries limited his impact at Wigan, and was released by the club at the end of the 1998 season.

After playing one season for Huddersfield Giants, injuries forced Wright to retire prematurely.

International honours
Nigel Wright won a cap for England while at Wakefield Trinity in 1995 against France. He is one of only eight players to have scored a drop goal for England.

Coaching career
In 2009, Wright joined the coaching staff at Warrington Wolves as an assistant to James Lowes.

Wright has named as assistant to Garry Schofield at Barrow Raiders ahead of the 2011 season. In March 2011, Wright took over as head coach following the departure of Schofield. He left the club in July 2011.

References

External links
Statistics at wigan.rlfans.com
Challenge Cup Special with Nigel Wright
Nigel Has The Wright Stuff For Jimmy
Rugby League: Team-By-Team Guide To Super League
Rugby League: Wright shown door by Wigan
Wright Returns to Take Bungee Jump for Charity 

1973 births
Living people
Barrow Raiders coaches
England national rugby league team players
English rugby league coaches
English rugby league players
Great Britain under-21 national rugby league team players
Huddersfield Giants players
Place of birth missing (living people)
Rugby league five-eighths
Rugby league locks
Wakefield Trinity players
Wigan Warriors players